Ciudad Cuauhtémoc is a city in the Huasteca Alta region of the Mexican state of Veracruz. 
It serves as the municipal seat of the surrounding Pueblo Viejo Municipality.

The name honours Cuauhtémoc (c. 1502–1525), last tlatoani of the Aztecs.

Demographics
In the 2005 INEGI Census, Ciudad Cuauhtémoc reported a total population of 8,950.

History
The settlement was founded in the early years of the Conquest, in the early 16th century, by Fray Andrés de Olmos. It was given city status in 1980.

References

External links
Pueblo Viejo on Veracruz State Govt. web page

Populated places in Veracruz